The Friedrichsplatz in Mannheim is one of the most completely preserved neo-Baroque and Art Nouveau structures in Germany. It was laid out in the years following the completion of the Mannheim Water Tower in 1889.

Water features

On the out-of-town side of the water tower is a water staircase that leads into a large basin with an adjacent fountain. The water feature, which operates from about the beginning of April to mid-October, is illuminated when darkness falls, with a colorful play of colors on weekends and holidays. The large fountain had first been put into operation on September 9, 1893. Using incandescent lamp technology, the fountain system's technology most recently included 98 spotlights, 16 color changers, 178 nozzles, and 20 controlled pumps. In June 2020, a new LED-based lighting system with 84 spotlights was put into operation, covering a wider color spectrum and also saving about 90 percent of the previous power consumption. The fountain system will be completely renovated by 2023.

External links

Official website

References

Mannheim